Mark Sarvas (born September 26, 1964) is an American novelist, critic, and blogger living in Los Angeles. He is the host of the literary blog The Elegant Variation and author of the novel Harry, Revised (Bloomsbury, Spring 2008). Harry, Revised was a finalist for the Fiction Prize of the Southern California Independent Booksellers Association, and was also a 2008 Denver Post Good Reads selection.

Sarvas is a member of the National Book Critics Circle, PEN/America and a contributing editor of the Los Angeles Review of Books.

His second novel, Memento Park, was acquired for publication by Farrar, Straus and Giroux in May 2014, for March 2018 publication.

Awards 
2005: Guardian Top 10 Litblog
2005: Los Angeles Magazine Top LA Blog
2006: Forbes Best of the Web
2008: Southern California Independent Booksellers Association: First Fiction Prize finalist
2018: Santa Monica Arts Fellowship
2019: AJL Fiction Award
2019: American Book Award
2019: Finalist, Sami Rohr Prize
2019: Shortlisted, JQ Wingate Literary Prize.

External links 
 Official website
 Literary Criticism
 NY Times Review of Joshua Cohen's Book of Numbers
 Publishers Weekly review of Memento Park

1964 births
Living people
21st-century American novelists
American bloggers
American literary critics
American male novelists
Writers from New York City
21st-century American male writers
Novelists from New York (state)
21st-century American non-fiction writers
American male non-fiction writers
American male bloggers